Yellowhead Power Station is a natural gas-fired power station owned by SaskPower, located in North Battleford, Saskatchewan, Canada and operated as a peaking plant. The plant was constructed and commissioned in December 2010 at a cost of $250 M CDN. The plant is controlled remotely by satellite from Regina.

Description 

The Yellowhead Power Station consists of:
 3 General Electric LM6000 simple cycle gas turbines for a total capacity of 138-megawatt commissioned in 2010.

See also 

 SaskPower

References

External links 
 SaskPower Station Description

Natural gas-fired power stations in Saskatchewan
SaskPower
North Battleford